The Texas Tech Red Raiders college football team competes in the NCAA Division I Football Bowl Subdivision (formerly known as Division I-A), representing Texas Tech University in the Big 12 Conference. Texas Tech has played its home games at Jones AT&T Stadium in Lubbock, Texas since 1947.

Texas Tech (then known as Texas Technological College) fielded its first intercollegiate football team during the 1925 season. The team was known as the "Matadors" from 1925 to 1936, a name suggested by the wife of E. Y. Freeland, the first football coach, to reflect the influence of the Spanish Renaissance architecture on campus. In 1932, Texas Tech joined the Border Intercollegiate Athletic Association, also known as the Border Conference. The school's short-lived Matadors moniker was replaced officially in 1937 with "Red Raiders", a nickname bestowed upon them by a sportswriter impressed by their bright scarlet uniforms that remains to this today. That same year, the team won its first conference championship and was invited to the Sun Bowl. The game was played on January 1, 1938, and resulted in a 7–6 loss to the West Virginia Mountaineers. Texas Tech suffered four more bowl losses before their first postseason win in the 1952 Sun Bowl. Before withdrawing from the Border Conference in 1956, the Red Raiders won nine conference championships, the most held by a Border Conference member.

In 1956, Texas Tech was admitted to the Southwest Conference (SWC) but was ineligible for any title during a four-year probationary period.  It gained full SWC membership and began official conference play in 1960. The Red Raiders won conference championships in 1976 and 1994. The team remained in the SWC until the conference dissolved in 1996. The university was invited and became a charter member in the South Division of the Big 12 Conference.

This is a list of their annual results.

Seasons

Notes

References

Texas Tech Red Raiders
Red Raiders
Texas Tech Red Raiders football seasons